Ovala is a village and the least populous municipality in the Astara Rayon of Azerbaijan.  It has a population of 258.

References 

Populated places in Astara District